Say It with Diamonds is a 1927 American silent drama film starring Betty Compson and Earle Williams, an early Vitagraph leading man and matinee idol. Directed by Jack Nelson and Arthur Gregor, this film is Williams's final screen performance before his death in April 1927.

Prints of the film are held at the Library of Congress and George Eastman House Motion Picture Collection.

Cast
Betty Compson as Betty Howard
Earle Williams as Horace Howard
Jocelyn Lee as Fay Demarest
Armand Kaliz as Armand Armour
Betty Baker as Secretary

References

External links
 
AllMovie.com

1927 films
American silent feature films
Films directed by Jack Nelson
1927 drama films
Silent American drama films
American black-and-white films
Films directed by Arthur Gregor
1920s American films